Ron Watton (July 1932) was a Canadian football player who played for the Toronto Argonauts, BC Lions and Hamilton Tiger-Cats. He previously played football with the Toronto Balmy Beach Beachers.

References

1930s births
Toronto Argonauts players
Living people